Dr Sue Page AM is a past President of the Rural Doctors Association of Australia and current Board member of Future Health Leaders, North Coast GP Training, and RACGP Rural As Associate Professor with the University of Sydney she links to the Northern Rivers University Centre for Rural Health, a collaboration between that university and the University of Southern Cross for the delivery of multidisciplinary health professional education in Australia. Until 2010 she was the inaugural Director of the North Coast Medical Education Collaboration, a venture linking the University of Sydney, the University of Western Sydney and the University of Wollongong which established year-long training for medical students in rural areas and later combined with the UCRH.

Career
As Clinical Lead for Education for the RACGP, Dr Page headed a review of national curriculum and the move toward outcomes based learning with statements able to be uploaded onto smart phones. She assisted in the creation of the College's new Fellowship of Advanced Rural General Practice, the FARGP, which includes processes for Recognition of Prior Learning for rural GPs in established practice. She has championed the uptake of Telehealth in Australian community based practice with roles in the Government Department of Health and Ageing Telehealth Advisory Group, conference speaking engagements  and contribution to RACGP Telehealth resources  including a new Active Learning Module.

Page previously held the position of inaugural Chair of the North Coast Area Health Care Advisory Council  within the NSW Department of Health, New South Wales Department of Health#Area Health Services and has been a board member of the Northern NSW Local Health District, from 2011 to 2016. She is a rural GP VMO at Ballina District Hospital and St Vincent's Hospital in Lismore. A Fellow of, and Supervisor for, both RACGP and ACRRM, she has post graduate training in the Early Management of Severe Trauma, a Diploma in Shared Care Psychiatry (Eating Disorders) and a Diploma in Obstetrics through the Australian and New Zealand College of Obstetrics and Gynaecology. Her practice includes primary health care within an Aboriginal community, and used to involve obstetrics at Ballina Hospital until the unit was closed due to workforce shortages.

Identified as one of the top ten people in Australia influencing General Practice, Dr Page was recognised in the Australian Honours as a Member of the Order of Australia on Australia Day 25 January 2008. The award is recognition for outstanding achievement and service. Dr Page received her award for service to medicine and to the community through commitment to improving access to health and medical services in rural and remote areas, and through professional, educational and advisory roles. 

Page has been instrumental in bringing cross-sector organisations together to work to common goals. Amongst achievements are listed contribution to resolving the 2003 Medical Indemnity crisis in Australia, the establishment of a dedicated training program for Procedural General Practice, and negotiating Australian Medicare Item Numbers for Nurses working within General Practices for procedures such as Pap smears  and for Allied Health Professionals caring for patients with chronic and complex disease. She continues to promote collaborative working arrangements in Primary Health Care, and to inspire the next generation of health workforce through a variety of speaking engagements.

Early life and family
Now an Australian Citizen, Dr Page was born in Washington DC in 1960. She is the third child of Colonel David Page, Chief of Publicity and Psychological Warfare for the US First Army and later deputy chief administrator of the US Veterans Administration, and Diana Hodgkinson Page, one of the three first Australian women trained as Diplomatic Staff Cadets and later posted to New York as Vice Consul. Colonel Page was awarded the Croix De Guerre, US Legion of Merit and Bronze Star with V for Valour.

Page attended the University of Newcastle where she later returned as the 2005 David Maddison Orator. In 1987 she married classmate Dr Chris Mitchell, the 2009–2010 President of the Royal Australian College of General Practice. They live on a farm in northern NSW with their three children, Robert Mitchell, Sara Mitchell, and Kate Mitchell.

Politics
At the 2007 federal election, Page was the endorsed National Party candidate for the electorate of Richmond in northern New South Wales where she took a strong stance on environmental issues including nuclear power. She lost to incumbent Labor MP Justine Elliot.

Ministerial appointments
2002–2003	NSW, General Practice Advisory Committee
2003		Commonwealth, Medical Indemnity Policy Review Panel I
2004		NSW, Clinical & Community Advisory Group 
2005–2006	Commonwealth, Australian Medical Workforce Advisory Committee, Rural Expertise
2005–2006	Commonwealth, Medical Indemnity Policy Review Panel II
2002–2007	NSW, Mental Health Sentinel Events Review Committee (MHSERC): Chair, Suicide Sub-committee
2003–2007	NSW, Expert Advisory Group for Drug and Alcohol
2003–2007	NSW, Chair, North Coast Area Health Service Area Health Care Advisory Council
2004–2007	NSW, Rural Health Priority Taskforce
2005–2007	NSW, Health Care Advisory Committee
2004–2007	NSW, Board of Clinical Excellence Commission
2006–2007	Commonwealth, 4th Pharmacy Agreement Professional Programs & Services Advisory Committee
2011–2012  NSW, Member of Advisory Board, Commission of Audit

Significant positions

2000–2004	ACRRM Representative for Far North NSW Coast
2002–2003	President, NSW Rural Doctors Association
2002–2003	Rural Doctors Network Representative to NSW Medical Board Assessment Panel for Overseas Trained Doctors
2002–2004	Member, NSW Rural Health Action Group
2003–2004	RDAA Representative on National Rural Health Alliance
2002–2005	RACGP Representative, NSW Aboriginal and Torres Strait Islander (ATSI) Maternal & Infant Health Committee
2003–2005	ACRRM Panel of Censors
2004–2006	Alliance of NSW Divisions (ANSWD) Rural Chapter Representative
2004–2006	President, Rural Doctors Association Australia
2005–2006	NSW Expert Advisory Committee for Paracetamol Use
2006		Acting Head of Department, Northern Rivers University Department of Rural Health
2006–2007	Past-President (Executive role), Rural Doctors Association Australia
2005–2007	RDAA Representative, National E-Health Transition Authority
2005–2007	Member, North Coast Australian Health Services Workforce Development Plan Implementation Steering Committee
2005–2007	Member, North Coast Area Health Services Learning and Development Committee
2007–2008	Member, Working Party: Abuse of Older Adults Prevention Project, Department of Veteran Affairs (DVA)
1990–2009 	GP/Partner, Lennox Head Medical Centre
2004–2009	board member, Northern Rivers General Practice Network
2003–2010	Member, North Coast Cross-Sector Collaboration in Indigenous Health Committee
2004–2010	Member, Community Advisory Board, UNSW School of Public Health
2008–2010	VMO and Medical Advisory Committee member, Lismore Private Hospital
2003–2010 	Director of Education, Northern Rivers University Department of Rural Health
2003–2010	North Coast Area Health Service workforce committee later Health Workforce Education Group
2009–2010	RACGP Representative, National Education Framework for Primary Maternity Services
2006–2010 	Director, North Coast Medical Education Collaboration (University of Wollongong, University of Western Sydney, and the Sydney University)
2008–2012	RACGP Representative, NEHTA Medication Management Reference Group
2008–2012	RACGP Representative, Primary Care Committee, Australian Commission on Safety and Quality in HealthCare
2010–2012	RACGP Representative, TeleHealth Advisory Group, Medical Benefits Division, Commonwealth Department of Health and Ageing
2010–2012	RACGP Representative, NPS Medicines Line Advisory group
2011–2012	RACGP Representative, NPS Prescribing Competencies Project
2012–2015       board member, Australian Medical Local Alliance
2014–2016 	Member, Medical Services Advisory Committee
2011–2016       board member, Northern NSW Local Health District
2011–current 	Member, RACGP Rural Education Committee
2011–current 	Member, RACGP National Standing Committee – Post Graduate Education
2011–current    board member & Deputy Chair, RACGP Rural
2011–current    board member, North Coast GP Training
2014-current    board member, Future Health Leaders
2016-current    board member RACGP NSW

References

Australian general practitioners
Living people
Members of the Order of Australia
1960 births
Recipients of the Legion of Merit